The Thanksgiving Promise is a 1986 American drama television film starring and directed by Beau Bridges, based on the 1983 young adult novel Chester, I Love You by Blaine Yorgason and Brenton Yorgason. It was produced by Walt Disney Television, and originally aired November 23, 1986 as a presentation of The Disney Sunday Movie on ABC.

Plot
Travis Tilby leaps into action when neighbor Stewart Larson asks him to mind an ailing goose slated to be part of Thanksgiving dinner. A gentle animal lover, Travis dotes on the bird, feeding it by hand and speaking to it in soothing tones. However, as Thanksgiving nears, Travis has second thoughts about seeing the bird slaughtered, and he appeals to his father, Hank,  and others in the community for help in saving the goose.

Cast
 Beau Bridges as Hank Tilby
 Millie Perkins as Lois Tilby
 Courtney Thorne-Smith as Sheryl
 Ed Lauter as Coach Gruniger
 Anne Haney as Mrs. Sudsup
 Beau Dremann as Alec
 Bill Calvert as Jason Tilby
 Jordan Bridges as Travis Tilby
 Jason Bateman as Steve Tilby
 Lloyd Bridges as Stewart Larson
 Jason Naylor as Arnold
 Jessica Puscas as Jenni Tilby
 Joshua Bryant as Sam the Vet
 Zero Hubbard as Jeff
 Tina Caspary as 1st Girl
 Scott Nemes as 1st Boy
 Kiblena Peace as Emily
 Mark Clayman as Tommy
 Dorothy Dean Bridges as Aggie Larson
 Allan Dietrich as Square Dance Caller
 Lucinda Jany as Neighbor Lady
 Leonard P. Geer as Old Man
 Jeff Bridges as Neighbor (uncredited)

References

External links
 

1986 films
1986 drama films
1980s American films
1980s English-language films
ABC network original films
American drama television films
Disney television films
Films about birds
Films based on American novels
Films based on young adult literature
Films scored by Bruce Broughton
Television films based on books
Thanksgiving in films
Walt Disney anthology television series episodes